NGC 124 is a spiral galaxy in the constellation Cetus. It was discovered by Truman Henry Safford on September 23, 1867. The galaxy was described as "very faint, large, diffuse, 2 faint stars to northwest" by John Louis Emil Dreyer, the compiler of the New General Catalogue.

The 17th magnitude supernova SN 2004dd was discovered in this galaxy on 12 July 2004.   It was a type II supernova.

References

External links
 

Unbarred spiral galaxies
Cetus (constellation)
Astronomical objects discovered in 1867
0124
Discoveries by Truman Safford